The Minister of Finance and the Public Service is Jamaica's chief financial official in charge of formulating both monetary and financial policies.  He works alongside the Bank of Jamaica and its Governor.

It is active in developing financial inclusion policy and is a member of the Alliance for Financial Inclusion.

Ministers
Donald Sangster, May 1953 - February 1955
Noel Newton Nethersole, February 1955 - May 1959
Vernon Arnett, May 1959 - April 1962
Donald Sangster, April 1962 - March 1967
Edward Seaga, March 1967 - March 1972
David Coore, March 1972 - 1978
Eric Bell, 1978 - 1980
Hugh Small, May 1980 - October 1980
Edward Seaga, 1980 - 1989
Seymour Mullings, 1989 - 1990
Percival Patterson, 1990 - 1991
Hugh Small, 1992 - 1993
Omar Davies, December 1993 - August 2007
Audley Shaw, September 2007 – January 2012
Peter Phillips, January 2012 - March 2016
Audley Shaw, March 2016 – 26 March 2018
Nigel A. L. Clarke, 2018 -

References

External links
 

Ministries and agencies of the government of Jamaica